Jamal Jamil Ahmad Nasir CVO is a lawyer and the former minister of justice in Jordan. He is a specialist in the rights of women under Islamic law.
Born in Jerusalem. 
Died at the age of 92.
Barrister at Law (Lincoln's Inn)

Member of the Jordan bar and entitled to practice before other Arab bars. Authorized to practice law in China. A specialist and Authority on International and conflict laws. Commercial law, common law, Arab & Islamic laws.
by Royal Decree the legal adviser to the late HM King Hussein and at the palace legal adviser to the Jordanian Embassy and armed forces in the UK.
Member of the American Arbitration Association. Member of the international law association. At one time, lecturer on International and conflict of laws at leading universities. Member of the International Academy of matrimonial lawyers. Former Minister of Justice, acting foreign minister and member of the Senate of Jordan.

Career
Nasir was admitted to the bar as a barrister of Lincoln's Inn. In 1955 he received his PhD from the School of Oriental and African Studies, University of London, for a thesis on the subject of "The doctrine of Kafa'a according to the early Islamic authorities and modern practice, with a critical edition of the Zaidi MS Al-mir'at al-mubayyina lil nazir ma huwa al-haqq fi mas'alat al-kafa'a". He is the former minister of justice in Jordan. He has written two books on aspects of Islamic law formerly poorly covered in the English language.

Selected publications
 The Islamic law of personal status. Graham & Trotman, London, 1986. (2nd 1990, 3rd revised  Kluwer 2001) 
 The status of women under Islamic law and under modern Islamic legislation. Graham & Trotman, London, 1990. (2nd 1994, 3rd Brill 2009)
 Israeli occupation and the law of belligerency: The case for justice, morality and human rights. Jamal J.A. Nasir, Amman, 2010.

 Under My Wig' by Dr Jamal Nasir.. Published by Gilgamesh Publishing 2013

References 

20th-century Jordanian lawyers
Legal writers
Members of the Senate of Jordan
Year of birth missing (living people)
Living people
Muslim writers
Commanders of the Royal Victorian Order
Alumni of SOAS University of London